This article presents a full discography of pop musician and singer-songwriter Scott Miller,  as the leader of the groups Alternate Learning, Game Theory, and The Loud Family.  Miller's discography includes thirteen studio albums (including a forthcoming posthumous release), four EPs, one live album, four compilations, seven singles (including promotional releases), six music videos, and one concert documentary video.

Studio albums and EPs

Live albums

Compilation albums

Singles and promotional releases

Tribute and cover album appearances

Various artist compilations

Music videos and DVDs

References

External links

Discographies of American artists
Pop music discographies
Scott Miller (pop musician)